James Eugene "Jim" Snyder Jr. (June 30, 1945 – September 12, 2021) was an American author, attorney and politician. He was a member of the Republican Party.

Early life and education 
Snyder was born on June 30, 1945 in Davidson County, North Carolina. He earned a bachelor's degree in history from Wake Forest University in 1967 and a J.D. degree there in 1970. While a student, Snyder played on the Wake Forest basketball team under Coach Bones McKinney.

Political career 
In 1971, Snyder served in the North Carolina House of Representatives, filling the unexpired term of his father who had died. He later chaired the Davidson County Republican Party.

In 2002, Snyder was the only major challenger to Elizabeth Dole in the Republican primary for United States Senate, garnering about 14 percent of the vote. He ran for Lieutenant Governor of North Carolina in 2004, winning the primary but losing the general election to Beverly Perdue. In 2008, Snyder filed to run for Lieutenant Governor again. He was endorsed by former Governor James Holshouser, but was defeated by state Sen. Robert Pittenger in the May 2008 primary.

Legacy and death 
Snyder was a prolific writer in corporation and insurance law, but also published a novel and a book of prayers. Snyder died on September 12, 2021, in his Lexington, North Carolina, home at age 76.

References

External links
 
 2002 campaign website
 2004 campaign website

|-

1945 births
2021 deaths
Republican Party members of the North Carolina House of Representatives
People from Davidson County, North Carolina
Wake Forest University School of Law alumni
Wake Forest Demon Deacons men's basketball players